Sebastián Andrés Barrientos Olivares (born 20 January 1989), commonly known as Seba Barrientos, is a Chilean former footballer who played as striker for Universidad Católica in the Chilean Primera División.

International career
Along with Chile U18 he won the 2008 João Havelange Tournament,  scoring a goal.

Barrientos was also used recurrently by Marcelo Bielsa as "sparring" for the senior national team.

Honours
Chile U18
 João Havelange Tournament (1): 2008

References

External links
 
 

1989 births
Living people
People from Osorno, Chile
Chilean footballers
Chile youth international footballers
Club Deportivo Universidad Católica footballers
Chilean Primera División players
Association football forwards